A list of films produced in Egypt in 1945. For an A-Z list of films currently on Wikipedia, see :Category:Egyptian films.

External links
 Egyptian films of 1945 at the Internet Movie Database
 Egyptian films of 1945 elCinema.com

Lists of Egyptian films by year
1945 in Egypt
Lists of 1945 films by country or language